Fifteenmile Creek is a  tributary stream of the Potomac River in the U.S. states of Maryland and Pennsylvania. The creek enters the Potomac River through Maryland's Green Ridge State Forest.

See also
List of Maryland rivers
List of rivers of Pennsylvania

References

Rivers of Allegany County, Maryland
Rivers of Maryland
Rivers of Pennsylvania
Rivers of Bedford County, Pennsylvania
Tributaries of the Potomac River